Luninets is a reserve air base of the Air Force and Air Defence Forces of the Republic of Belarus located in Luninets, Brest Region.

The airfield was a fighter-bomber training area during the Cold War. It was home to the 1169th BRAT (1169th Aviation Equipment Reserve Base) flying Mil Mi-8 and Mil Mi-24 helicopters.

During the 2022 Russian invasion of Ukraine the 18th Guards Assault Aviation Regiment was deployed here using Sukhoi Su-25s from Chernigovka (air base). These were supported by the 266th Assault Aviation Regiment with their Sukhoi Su-25's from Step (air base).

In early October it was reported that Russia had deployed approximately 20 Shahed-136 drones to the base.

See also
List of airports in Belarus

References

External links 
 Airport record for Luninets Airport at Landings.com

Soviet Air Force bases
Military installations of Belarus
Airports in Belarus
Luninets

Belarusian Air Force